Hip Harp (also released as The Best of Dorothy Ashby) is an album by jazz harpist Dorothy Ashby recorded in 1958 and released on the Prestige label.

Reception

Allmusic reviewed the album awarding it 4½ stars.

Track listing 
All compositions by Dorothy Ashby except as indicated
 "Pawky" - 7:07  
 "Moonlight in Vermont" (John Blackburn, Karl Suessdorf) - 5:17  
 "Back Talk" - 5:07  
 "Dancing in the Dark" (Howard Dietz, Arthur Schwartz) - 4:45  
 "Charmaine" (Lew Pollack, Erno Rapee) - 4:04  
 "Jollity" - 3:38  
 "There's a Small Hotel" (Lorenz Hart, Richard Rodgers) - 5:53

Personnel 
Dorothy Ashby - harp
Frank Wess - flute
Herman Wright - bass
Art Taylor - drums

Production
Bob Weinstock - supervisor
Rudy Van Gelder - engineer

References

External links
A Dorothy Ashby Discography

Dorothy Ashby albums
1958 albums
Prestige Records albums
Albums recorded at Van Gelder Studio
Albums produced by Bob Weinstock